Lachlan Weller (born 23 February 1996) is a professional Australian rules footballer playing for the Gold Coast Football Club in the Australian Football League (AFL). He previously played for the Fremantle Football Club from 2015 to 2017.

Personal life 
Originally from Tasmania, Weller moved to Queensland at age 15 with his family, when his brother Maverick was recruited by the Gold Coast Football Club.  Lachie then joined the Gold Coast Suns' junior academy development squad, but did not qualify as a priority selection due to not fulfilling the length of residence requirements. During this time, he completed his schooling commitments at All Saints Anglican School on the Gold Coast and played junior football for Broadbeach as well as Southport. He was drafted by Fremantle with their first selection, number 13 overall, in the 2014 AFL draft.

AFL career

After playing well for Peel Thunder Football Club in the West Australian Football League, Weller made his debut in round 18 of the 2015 AFL season against Greater Western Sydney. At the conclusion of the 2017 AFL season, after playing 47 games for Fremantle, Weller requested a trade to Gold Coast, subsequently being traded, along with pick 41 in the 2017 AFL draft for pick 2.

Statistics
 Statistics are correct to the end of round 3, 2022

|-
|- style="background-color: #EAEAEA"
! scope="row" style="text-align:center" | 2015
|style="text-align:center;"|
| 14 || 3 || 0 || 0 || 14 || 17 || 31 || 7 || 7 || 0.0 || 0.0 || 4.7 || 5.7 || 10.3 || 2.3 || 2.3 || 0
|-
! scope="row" style="text-align:center" | 2016
|style="text-align:center;"|
| 14 || 22 || 12 || 10 || 171 || 169 || 340 || 55 || 72 || 0.6 || 0.4 || 7.8 || 7.7 || 15.4 || 2.5 || 3.3 || 2
|- style="background-color: #EAEAEA"
! scope="row" style="text-align:center" | 2017
|style="text-align:center;"|
| 14 || 22 || 5 || 4 || 258 || 184 || 441 || 89 || 53 || 0.2 || 0.2 || 11.7 || 8.4 || 20.1 || 4.0 || 2.4 || 0
|-
! scope="row" style="text-align:center" | 2018
|style="text-align:center;"|
| 14 || 22 || 4 || 8 || 258 || 175 || 433 || 93 || 57 || 0.2 || 0.4 || 11.7 || 8.0 || 19.7 || 4.2 || 2.6 || 3
|- style="background-color: #EAEAEA"
! scope="row" style="text-align:center" | 2019
|style="text-align:center;"|
| 14 || 17 || 2 || 5 || 227 || 148 || 375 || 81 || 47 || 0.1 || 0.3 || 13.4 || 8.7 || 22.1 || 4.8 || 2.8 || 0
|-
! scope="row" style="text-align:center" | 2020
|style="text-align:center;"|
| 14 || 17 || 12 || 3 || 161 || 125 || 286 || 39 || 48 || 0.7 || 0.2 || 9.5 || 7.4 || 16.8 || 2.3 || 2.8 || 1
|- style="background-color: #EAEAEA"
! scope="row" style="text-align:center" | 2021
|style="text-align:center;"|
| 14 || 13 || 7 || 3 || 137 || 104 || 241 || 71 || 45 || 0.5 || 0.2 || 10.5 || 8.0 || 18.5 || 5.5 || 3.4 || 0
|-
! scope="row" style="text-align:center" | 2022
|style="text-align:center;"|
| 14 || 2 || 0 || 0 || 26 || 15 || 41 || 8 || 0 || 0.0 || 0.0 || 13.0 || 7.5 || 20.5 || 4.0 || 0.0 || TBA
|- class="sortbottom"
! colspan=3| Career
! 118
! 42
! 33
! 1251
! 938
! 2189
! 443
! 328
! 0.4
! 0.3
! 10.6
! 7.9
! 18.6
! 3.8
! 2.8
! 6
|}

Notes

References

External links

WAFL statistics

Living people
1996 births
Australian rules footballers from Tasmania
Australian rules footballers from Queensland
Fremantle Football Club players
Gold Coast Football Club players
Peel Thunder Football Club players
Southport Australian Football Club players
Broadbeach Australian Football Club players
Burnie Dockers Football Club players